This article gives a list of AMD microprocessors, sorted by generation and release year. If applicable and openly known, the designation(s) of each processor's core (versions) is (are) listed in parentheses. For an overview over concrete product, you then need to consult further articles, like e.g. list of AMD accelerated processing units.

Features overview

AMD IP x86 CPUs

APUs
APU features table

AMD-originated architectures

Am2900 series (1975) 
 Am2901 4-bit-slice ALU (1975)
 Am2902 Look-Ahead Carry Generator
 Am2903 4-bit-slice ALU, with hardware multiply
 Am2904 Status and Shift Control Unit
 Am2905 Bus Transceiver
 Am2906 Bus Transceiver with Parity
 Am2907 Bus Transceiver with Parity
 Am2908 Bus Transceiver with Parity
 Am2909 4-bit-slice address sequencer
 Am2910 12-bit address sequencer
 Am2911 4-bit-slice address sequencer
 Am2912 Bus Transceiver
 Am2913 Priority Interrupt Expander
 Am2914 Priority Interrupt Controller

29000 (29K) (1987–95) 
 AMD 29000 (aka 29K) (1987)
 AMD 29005 Above without (functional) MMU and BTC
 AMD 29027 FPU
 AMD 29030
 AMD 29050 with on-chip FPU (1990)
 AMD 292xx embedded processor

Non-x86 architecture processors

2nd source (1974) 
Am9080 (second source for Intel 8080)

2nd source (1982) 
Am29X305 (second source for Signetics 8X305)

ARM64 based Opteron Processors (2016) 
AMD Opteron A1100 Series

i386 architecture processors

2nd source (1979–91) 
(second-sourced x86 processors produced under contract with Intel)
 8086
 8088
 Am286 (2nd-sourced 80286, so not a proper Amx86 member)

Amx86 series (1991–95) 
 Am386 (1992)
 Am486 (1993)
 Am5x86 (1995)

K5 architecture (1996) 
 AMD K5 (SSA5/5k86)

K6 architecture (1997–2001) 
 AMD K6 (NX686/Little Foot) (1997)
 AMD K6-2 (Chompers/CXT)
 AMD K6-2-P (Mobile K6-2)
 AMD K6-III (Sharptooth)
 AMD K6-III-P
 AMD K6-2+
 AMD K6-III+

K7 architecture (1999–2005) 
 Athlon (Slot A) (Argon, Pluto/Orion, Thunderbird) (1999)
 Athlon (Socket A) (Thunderbird) (2000)
 Duron (Spitfire, Morgan, Applebred) (2000)
 Athlon MP (Palomino, Thoroughbred, Barton, Thorton) (2001)
 Mobile Athlon 4 (Corvette/Mobile Palomino) (2001)
 Athlon XP (Palomino, Thoroughbred (A/B), Barton, Thorton) (2001)
 Mobile Athlon XP (Mobile Palomino) (2002)
 Mobile Duron (Camaro/Mobile Morgan) (2002)
 Sempron (Thoroughbred, Thorton, Barton) (2004)
 Mobile Sempron

AMD64 architecture processors

K8 core architecture (2003–2014) 
K8 series
 Opteron (SledgeHammer) (2003)
 Athlon 64 FX (SledgeHammer) (2003)
 Athlon 64 (ClawHammer/Newcastle) (2003)
 Mobile Athlon 64 (Newcastle) (2004)
 Athlon XP-M (Dublin) (2004) Note: AMD64 disabled
 Sempron (Paris) (2004) Note: AMD64 disabled
 Athlon 64 (Winchester) (2004)
 Turion 64 (Lancaster) (2005)
 Athlon 64 FX (San Diego) (1st half 2005)
 Athlon 64 (San Diego/Venice) (1st half 2005)
 Sempron (Palermo) (1st half 2005)
 Athlon 64 X2 (Manchester) (1st half 2005)
 Athlon 64 X2 (Toledo) (1st half 2005)
 Athlon 64 FX (Toledo) (2nd half 2005)
 Turion 64 X2 (Taylor) (1st half 2006)
 Athlon 64 X2 (Windsor) (1st half 2006)
 Athlon 64 FX (Windsor) (1st half 2006)
 Athlon 64 X2 (Brisbane) (2nd half 2006)
 Athlon 64 (Orleans) (2nd half 2006)
 Sempron (Manila) (1st half 2006)
 Sempron (Sparta)
 Opteron (Santa Rosa)
 Opteron (Santa Ana)
 Mobile Sempron

K10 core architecture (2007–2013) 
K10 series CPUs (2007–2013)
 All Phenom and Phenom II-branded CPUs implement K10: List of AMD Phenom processors
 Opteron (Barcelona) (10 September 2007)
 Phenom FX (Agena FX) (Q1 2008)
 Phenom X4 (9-series) (Agena) (19 November 2007)
 Phenom X3 (8-series) (Toliman) (April 2008)
 Athlon 6-series (Kuma) (February 2007)
 Athlon 4-series (Kuma) (2008)
 Athlon X2 (Rana) (Q4 2007)
 Sempron (Spica)
 Opteron (Budapest)
 Opteron (Shanghai)
 Opteron (Magny-Cours)
 Phenom II (X4 on January 8, 2009, X6 on April 27, 2010)List of AMD Phenom processors
 Athlon II
 Turion II (Caspian) More info

K10 series APUs (2011–2012)
 Concrete products are codenamed "Llano": List of AMD accelerated processing units.
 Llano AMD Fusion (K10 cores + Redwood-class GPU) (launch Q2 2011, this is the very first AMD APU) uses Socket FM1

Bulldozer architecture; Bulldozer, Piledriver, Steamroller, Excavator (2011–2017) 
Bulldozer Series CPUs
 Concrete products codenamed Zambezi and Vishera: List of AMD FX processors
 Zambezi (Bulldozer core) (Q4 2011)
 Vishera (Piledriver core) (Q4 2012)
 Concrete products codenamed "Zurich", "Valencia" and "Interlagos": List of AMD Opteron processors
 Interlagos Opteron (Bulldozer core) (Q4 2011)
 Concrete products are codenamed "Kaveri", etc.: List of AMD accelerated processing units.
 Kaveri (Steamroller core) (Q1 2014)
 Carrizo (Excavator core) (2015)
 Bristol Ridge (Excavator core supporting DDR4) (2016) (and Stoney Ridge implements Zen microarchitecture but utilizes the same Socket.)

Low-power architecture; Bobcat, Jaguar, Puma (2011–present) 
 All products are listed in List of AMD accelerated processing units.
 Bobcat series APUs (2011–):
 Ontario (Bobcat cores + Cedar-class GPU) (launch Q1 2011)
 Zacate (Bobcat cores + Cedar-class GPU) (launch Q1 2011)
 Jaguar series APUs (2013–)
 Kabini (notebooks)
 Temash (tablets)
 Kyoto (micro-servers)
 G-Series (embedded)
 Puma series APUs (2014–)
 Beema (notebooks)
 Mullins (tablets)

Zen core architecture (2017–present) 
Zen-based CPUs and some APUs use the "Ryzen"-brand: List of AMD Ryzen processors, while some APUs use the brand "Athlon": List of AMD Athlon processors.

Zen series CPUs and APUs (released 2017)
 Summit Ridge Ryzen 1000 series (desktop)
 Whitehaven Ryzen Threadripper 1000 series (desktop)
 Raven Ridge Ryzen 2000 APU series with RX Vega (desktop & laptop)
 Naples Epyc (server)

Zen+ series CPUs and APUs (released 2018)
 Pinnacle Ridge Ryzen 2000 series (desktop)
 Colfax Ryzen Threadripper 2000 series (desktop)
 Picasso Ryzen 3000 APU series with RX Vega (desktop & laptop)

Zen 2 series CPUs and APUs (released 2019)
 Matisse Ryzen 3000 series (desktop)
 Castle Peak Ryzen Threadripper 3000 series (desktop)
 Renoir Ryzen 4000 APU series with RX Vega (desktop & laptop)
 Lucienne Ryzen 5000 APU series (laptop)
 Rome Epyc (server)
 Mendocino Ryzen 7020 APU series (laptop)

Zen 3 series CPUs and APUs (released 2020)
 Vermeer Ryzen 5000 series (desktop)
 Chagall Ryzen Threadripper 5000 series (desktop)
 Cezanne Ryzen 5000 series (desktop & laptop)
 Milan Epyc (server)
 Milan-X Epyc (server)
 Barcelo Ryzen 5000 series (laptop)
 Barcelo-R Ryzen 7030 series (laptop)

Zen 3+ series CPUs and APUs (released 2022)
 Rembrandt Ryzen 6000 series (laptop)
 Rembrandt-R Ryzen 7035 series (laptop)

Zen 4 series CPUs and APUs (released 2022)
 Raphael Ryzen 7000 series (desktop)
 Genoa Epyc (server)
 Dragon Range Ryzen 7045 series (laptop)
 Phoenix Ryzen 7040 series (laptop)

See also 
 Table of AMD processors
 List of AMD chipsets
 List of AMD mobile processors
 List of AMD Athlon processors
 List of AMD Athlon XP processors
 List of AMD Athlon 64 processors
 List of AMD Athlon X2 processors
 List of AMD Duron processors
 List of AMD Sempron processors
 List of AMD Turion processors
 List of AMD Opteron processors
 List of AMD Phenom processors
 List of AMD FX processors
 List of AMD accelerated processing units
 List of AMD Ryzen processors
 List of AMD CPU microarchitectures
 List of Intel processors
 Apple M1

References 

AMD